The 134th Massachusetts General Court, consisting of the Massachusetts Senate and the Massachusetts House of Representatives, met in 1913 during the governorship of Eugene Foss. Levi H. Greenwood served as president of the Senate and Grafton D. Cushing served as speaker of the House.

Senators

Representatives

See also
 Massachusetts 1913 law
 1913 Massachusetts gubernatorial election
 63rd United States Congress
 List of Massachusetts General Courts

References

Further reading

External links
 
 

Political history of Massachusetts
Massachusetts legislative sessions
massachusetts
1913 in Massachusetts